K4 or K-4 may refer to:

Military
 Daewoo K4, a  South Korean automatic grenade launcher
 HMS K4, a 1915 British K class submarine
 K 4 or Norrland Dragoon Regiment, a Swedish Army cavalry regiment
 K-4 (SLBM), an Indian submarine-launched ballistic missile
 USS K-4 (SS-35), a 1914 United States Navy K-class submarine

Transport
 China Railway K3/4
 K-4 (Kansas highway), a highway in Kansas
 Kalitta Air, IATA code K4, an American cargo airline
 LNER Class K4, a British class of 2-6-0 steam locomotives
 London Buses route K4, a Transport for London contracted bus route
 PRR K4s or Pennsylvania Railroad Type K4, a class of American 4-6-2 steam locomotives

Other uses
 K4, a Security company 
 K4, a four-man sprint kayak
 K4, a model of the British red telephone box
 K4, a normal modal logic
 K, in graph theory, the complete graph of four vertices
 K, in abstract algebra, the Klein four-group
 K4 (mountain) or Gasherbrum II, a mountain between China and Pakistan
 Kawai K4, a digital synthesizer made by Kawai Musical Instruments
 Koalisyon ng Katapatan at Karanasan sa Kinabukasan (K4, Coalition of Truth and Experience for Tomorrow), a Philippine political coalition
 K4 refers to Kryptos part 4, the last section of the cryptographic puzzle sculpture (currently unsolved)

See also
 4K (disambiguation)